Taekwondo took place from December 7 to December 10 at the 2006 Asian Games in Doha, Qatar. Men's and women's competitions were held in eight weight categories for each. All competition took place at the Qatar Sports Club Indoor Hall. Each country except the host nation was limited to having 6 men and 6 women.

Schedule

Medalists

Men

Women

Medal table

Participating nations
A total of 251 athletes from 34 nations competed in taekwondo at the 2006 Asian Games:

References

External links
 2006 Asian Games website

 
2006 Asian Games events
Asian Games
2006